The 1959 Florida State Seminoles football team represented Florida State University in the 1959 NCAA University Division football season.

Schedule

Roster
QB Joe Majors, Sr.

References

Florida State
Florida State Seminoles football seasons
Florida State Seminoles football